Bernardino Cirillo Franco (May 20, 1500 – June 19, 1575), also called Bernardino Cirillo and Cyrilo Franco, was a Roman Catholic bishop of Loreto, Italy.

He was born in the city of L'Aquila, Italy on May 20, 1500. His father was Pietro Sante de' Cirilli and his mother was Gemma Bucci.

He participated in the Council of Trent and was interested in improving Church music. He published litanies to the Virgin Mary. Cirillo advocated a return to the simplicity and harmony of the earlier forms of Church music rather than elaborate forms of organ music.

Cirillo attacked "modern" church music in a 1549 letter to Ugolino Gualteruzzi. In 1649, King John IV of Portugal wrote a treatise entitled Defense of modern music against the mistaken opinion of Bishop Cyrilo Franco [i.e., Bernardino Cirillo], presenting a point-by-point rebuttal of Cirillo's letter.

He died in Rome on June 19, 1575.

Bibliography

References

External links
 

16th-century Italian Roman Catholic theologians
1500 births
1575 deaths